West Branch may refer to:

Communities
 West Branch, Iowa, city in Cedar and Johnson counties
 West Branch, Michigan, city in Ogemaw County
 West Branch, New Brunswick, in the Local Service District of Weldford Parish
 West Branch River John, in Pictou County, Nova Scotia
 West Branch Township (disambiguation)

Streams
 West Branch Brandywine Creek, tributary of Brandywine Creek in Pennsylvania
 West Branch Carrabassett River, tributary of the Carrabassett River in Maine
 West Branch Chillisquaque Creek, tributary of Chillisquaque Creek in Pennsylvania
 West Branch Dead Diamond River, tributary of the Dead Diamond River in New Hampshire
 West Branch Delaware River, tributary of the Delaware River in New York and Pennsylvania
 West Branch Dyberry Creek, tributary of Dyberry Creek in Pennsylvania
 West Branch Eastern River, tributary of the Eastern River in Maine
 West Branch Ellis River tributary of the Ellis River in Maine
 West Branch Feather River, tributary of Lake Oroville in California
 West Branch Handsome Brook, tributary of Handsome Brook in New York
 West Branch Laramie River, tributary of the Laramie River in Colorado
 West Branch Little Black River (Quebec–Maine), a tributary of the Little Black River in Quebec, Canada, and northern Maine, USA
 West Branch Little Dead Diamond River, tributary of the Little Dead Diamond River in New Hampshire
 West Branch Little Magalloway River, tributary of the Little Magalloway River in Maine and New Hampshire
 West Branch Machias River, tributary of the Machias River in Maine
 West Branch Mad River, tributary of the Mad River in New Hampshire
 West Branch Magalloway River, tributary of the Magalloway River in Maine and New Hampshire
 West Branch Mattawamkeag River, tributary of the Mattawamkeag River in Maine
 West Branch Mohawk River (New Hampshire), tributary of the Mohawk River in New Hampshire
 West Branch Moose River (Maine), tributary of the South Branch Moose River in Maine
 West Branch Narraguagus River (Cherryfield, Maine), tributary of the Narraguagus River in Maine
 West Branch Narraguagus River (Hancock County, Maine), tributary of the Narraguagus River in Maine
 West Branch (New Hampshire), tributary of Ossipee Lake
 West Branch Nezinscot River, tributary of the Nezinscot River in Maine
 West Branch Otego Creek, tributary of Otego Creek in New York
 West Branch Oyster River, tributary of the Oyster River in Maine
 West Branch Peabody River, tributary of the Peabody River in New Hampshire
 West Branch Penobscot River, tributary of the Penobscot River in Maine
 West Branch Pine Creek, tributary of Pine Creek in Pennsylvania
 West Branch Piscataquis River, tributary of the Piscataquis River in Maine
 West Branch Pleasant River (Piscataquis River), tributary of the Piscataquis River in Maine
 West Branch Schuylkill River, tributary of the Schuylkill River in Pennsylvania
 West Branch Sheepscot River, tributary of the Sheepscot River in Maine
 West Branch Souhegan River, tributary of the Souhegan River in New Hampshire
 West Branch Sugar River, tributary of the Sugar River in Wisconsin
 West Branch Susquehanna River, tributary of the Susquehanna River
 West Branch Swift River (Maine), tributary of the Swift River in Maine
 West Branch Tenmile River, tributary of the Tenmile River in Maine
 West Branch Trout Creek, tributary of Trout Creek in New York
 West Branch Unadilla River, tributary of Unadilla River in New York
 West Branch Union River, tributary of the Union River in Maine
 West Branch Upper Ammonoosuc River, tributary of the Upper Ammonoosuc River in New Hampshire
 West Branch Wading River, tributary of the Wading River in New Jersey 
 West Branch Warner River, tributary of the Warner River in New Hampshire
 West Branch (Cayuga Inlet), a tributary of Cayuga Inlet in New York

Other
 West Branch (journal), literary journal based at Bucknell University
 West Branch Area School District, in Clearfield County, Pennsylvania
 West Branch Area Junior/Senior High School, part of the above school district
 West Branch Commercial Historic District, in Ohio
 West Branch High School, in Beloit, Ohio
 West Branch Reservoir, in Putnam County, New York
 West Branch State Park, in Ohio
 West Branch Susquehanna Valley, in Pennsylvania

See also

 Branch (disambiguation)
 East Branch (disambiguation)
 North Branch (disambiguation)
 South Branch (disambiguation)
 West Long Branch, New Jersey